Ahmad ibn Muhammad al-Nahawandi, also called Al-Nahawandi, was a Persian astronomer of the 8th and 9th centuries. His name indicates that he was from Nahavand, now in modern Iran.

Al-Nahawandi lived and worked at the Academy of Gundishapur, in Khuzestan, Iran, at the time of Yahya ibn Khalid ibn Barmak, who died in 803, where he is reported to have been making astronomical observations in around 800. He and the astronomer and mathematician Mashallah ibn Athari were among the earliest Islamic era astronomers who flourished during the reign of al-Mansur, the second Abbasid caliph.

Al-Nahawandi compiled astronomical tables under the title .

References

Sources

Further reading
  (p.221)

Year of birth unknown
People from Nahavand
9th-century Iranian astronomers
Astronomers of the medieval Islamic world
9th-century people from the Abbasid Caliphate
9th-century Iranian mathematicians